Tello may refer to:

People 
 Tello (bishop of Chur)
 Tello Pérez de Meneses
 Tello Téllez de Meneses
 Tello Alfonso, Lord of Aguilar de Campoo
 Tello (surname)

Places
 Tello, Huila
 Tello, Cameroon
 Tell Telloh, the site of ancient Girsu

Other uses
 Tello (dance)
 Tello Mobile